Sante Geminiani (4 September 1919 - 15 August 1951) was an Italian Grand Prix motorcycle road racer.

Born in Lugo in the Emilia-Romagna, he began his professional Grand Prix racing career in 1949 riding for the Moto Guzzi factory racing team. Gemiani finished in third place behind the dominant Gilera factory teammates, Geoff Duke and Alfredo Milani in the 1951 Belgian Grand Prix held at the Spa-Francorchamps Circuit. Geminiani was killed on August 15, 1951 after colliding with his Moto Guzzi teammate, Gianni Leoni, during practice for the Ulster Grand Prix held at the Clady Circuit in Northern Ireland.

Career statistics

By season

References

1919 births
1951 deaths
People from Lugo, Emilia-Romagna
Italian motorcycle racers
500cc World Championship riders
Motorcycle racers who died while racing
Sport deaths in Northern Ireland
Sportspeople from the Province of Ravenna